Janephal is a village in Buldhana District in the Indian state of Maharashtra. It is situated on Maharashtra State Highway 171 between Khamgaon and Mehkar. Janephal is known for its wide roads and central drainage system, which are rare in rural areas.

History 
Janephal appears in Marwadi history. The town existed before 400 B.C. Two original stone gates (Vesh) and one small fort (Gadhi) still exist in the village.

Notable people 

 Sadanand Deshmukh, author awarded the Sahitya Akademi Award in 2004.

References

External links

Villages in Buldhana district